Oliver P. Rood (1844 – June 1, 1885) was an American soldier who fought with the Union Army in the American Civil War. Rood received his country's highest award for bravery during combat, the Medal of Honor, for actions taken on July 3, 1863, during the Battle of Gettysburg.

Civil War service
Although Rood was born in Kentucky, a southern state in the American Civil War, he joined the Union Army out of Vigo County, Indiana at the outset of the war. He was mustered into the army as a private in Company F of the 14th Indiana Volunteers for a three year term of service. When this term ended he joined with the 20th Indiana Volunteers. It was with this regiment that Rood fought at the Battle of Gettysburg under General Winfield Scott Hancock and witnessed his charge against General James Longstreet at Cemetery Hill. 

On the third day of the battle, Rood captured the flag of the 21st North Carolina Infantry, for which he was awarded the Medal of Honor in 1864. Rood was the only soldier from Indiana to receive the Medal of Honor during the Battle of Gettysburg.

Medal of Honor citation

References

External links
Oliver P. Rood on Find A Grave

1844 births
1885 deaths
American Civil War recipients of the Medal of Honor
People from Davidson County, Tennessee
People of Tennessee in the American Civil War
United States Army Medal of Honor recipients
Burials at Mount Olivet Cemetery (Nashville)